Chatham Island is an island of the Andaman Islands. It belongs to the South Andaman administrative district, part of the Indian union territory of Andaman and Nicobar Islands.

History
This is the island where the earliest British settlement in the Andamans began. In 1883, the British established the Chatham Saw Mill. In 1990, the Indians built the Forest Museum offering insight on the forest team activities, and has displays on the history of timber milling on the island.

Geography
The island belongs to the Port Blair Islands and lies in the middle of Port Meadows.

Administration
Politically, Chatham Island, along neighboring Port Blair Islands, are part of Port Blair Taluk.

References 

Islands of South Andaman district
Populated places in India
Islands of India
Islands of the Bay of Bengal